Ştefan Barbu (born 2 March 1908 in Arad, Austria-Hungary (now Romania) — died 30 June 1970 in Arad) was a Romanian football striker, who played at the 1930 FIFA World Cup in Uruguay.

Career 
Ştefan Barbu made his debut at Olimpia Arad. In 1921, he moved to Gloria Arad, where, aged 17, made his first senior appearance. In 1927, only nineteen years old, Barbu made his debut for Romania national team, in a 3–3 draw against Poland. In 1930 Barbu was a member of the Romanian team which played at the 1930 FIFA World Cup: he played against Peru and Uruguay, without scoring any goals. His last match for the national team was in the same year, when Romania lost to Bulgaria. In 1933 he moved at Rapid București where he won three times the Romanian Cup (1934–1935, 1935–1936, 1937–1938) and was also the top scorer of Liga I in 1935–1936 with 23 goals. In 1938 Barbu returned to Gloria Arad, where he played until his retirement in 1942. After his playing career, Ştefan Barbu has been a referee for 15 years. In 1957 he was appointed as the president of CFR, a football club based in Arad.

Honours

Club
Rapid București
Cupa României (3): 1934–35, 1936–37, 1937–38

Individual
Liga I top-scorer (1): 1935–36

References

External links
 
 
 
 
 

1908 births
1970 deaths
Sportspeople from Arad, Romania
People from the Kingdom of Hungary
1930 FIFA World Cup players
Liga I players
FC Rapid București players
CS Gloria Arad players
Romanian footballers
Romania international footballers
Association football forwards
Romanian football referees
Romanian sports executives and administrators